Muros is a comarca in the Galician Province of A Coruña. The overall population of this local region is 12,513 (2019).

Municipalities
Carnota and Muros

References 

Comarcas of the Province of A Coruña